Typhlopseudothelphusa is a genus of troglobitic, blind cave crabs in the family Pseudothelphusidae, containing the following species:
 Typhlopseudothelphusa acanthochela Hobbs, 1986
 Typhlopseudothelphusa hyba Rodríguez & Hobbs, 1989
 Typhlopseudothelphusa juberthiei Delamare Debouteville, 1976
 Typhlopseudothelphusa mitchelli Delamare Debouteville, 1976
 Typhlopseudothelphusa mocinoi Rioja, 1952

References

Pseudothelphusidae